ViswaSanthi Foundation is a non-profit organization established by actor Mohanlal in the names of his parents Viswanathan and Santhakumari in 2015. It is registered as a Section-8 Company of the Companies Act 2013, under the name ViswaSanthi Development Foundation. The foundation was started with the objective of creating and delivering high impact and focused programs to the under privileged sections of the society in the areas of health care and education.

Activities
In 2018, Mohanlal met the Prime Minister of India Narendra Modi and briefed about the foundation's social initiatives. The foundation has sent relief materials to different parts of Kerala during 2018 and 2019 Kerala floods including new house to the family of a flood rescue operator and children's education for one of the victims. They launched the Amrita-ViswaSanthi Health Care project to help poor children suffering from heart ailments and meet their heart surgery expenses in Amrita hospital.

During COVID-19 pandemic in India, the foundation has donated PPE kits and N95 masks to healthcare workers and police officials in Kerala, Tamil Nadu, Pune and laptops, tablets and television sets for schools across Kerala.

The foundation donates an autonomous robot, KARMI-Bot, for the isolation ward at Government Medical College, Ernakulam, which helps to dispense food, medicine, collect the trash left away by COVID-19 patients, perform disinfection and enable video call between the doctors and patients.

In May 2021, the foundation has provided beds with oxygen and ventilator support and portable X-ray machines to various hospitals in Kerala. They also provide support for the installation of Oxygen pipeline to two wards and Triage ward of Government Medical College, Ernakulam. The foundation executes this 1.5 crore project with EY Global Delivery Services and UST.

References

External links 
 Official website

Foundations based in India
Non-profit organisations based in India
Organizations established in 2015
Organisations based in Kochi
Mohanlal
2015 establishments in Kerala